Mohammad-Reza Gharaei Ashtiani is a member of the Iranian military with the rank of Brigadier General who has served as the minister of defence since 2021. Ashtiani was sworn in on August 25, 2021, replacing Brigadier General Amir Hatami who held role since 2017.

Military career
Ashtiani was promoted to the Deputy Chief of Staff of the Armed Forces of Islamic Republic of Iran (Artesh) on July 2, 2019, following a decree by Supreme Leader Ali Khamenei. Ashtiani replaced Major General Ataollah Salehi.

He was chosen to be the Minister of Defense by President Ebrahim Raisi and then was approved for the position and took office on August 25, 2021.

Defense Minister
Ashtiani’s selection for the position was favored by outgoing minister Amir Hatami who called Ashtiani the “best candidate” for position.

Ashtiani also said that he would prioritize exporting various defense products to other countries around the world.

References

Living people
1960 births
Islamic Republic of Iran Army brigadier generals
Islamic Republic of Iran Army personnel of the Iran–Iraq War
Iranian individuals subject to the U.S. Department of the Treasury sanctions
Politicians from Tehran
21st-century Iranian politicians